Adventure Sound (meaning "bay of the labyrinth") is a bay/fjord on the south east coast of East Falkland. It is in Lafonia between Choiseul Sound and the Bay of Harbours, and forms the upper segment of the "E" of the peninsula.

References

Bays of East Falkland
Sounds (geography)